"Doomquest" is a two-issue Iron Man story arc written by David Michelinie and Bob Layton with art by John Romita Jr. and published by Marvel Comics. The arc first appears in Iron Man #149–150.  One of the most popular stories of the title character, it establishes Doctor Doom as a member of his rogues gallery, a villainous counterpart who mirrors the superhero with his wealth, power armor and engineering skill.

Plot
Tony Stark learns that an employee of his made illegal sales of technology to Doctor Doom. After immediately firing the employee, Stark cancels the sale and attempts to regain the payment. Doom not only refuses the refund, but sends agents to seize the refused goods by force. Stark, as Iron Man, is unable to prevent the robbery and travels to Doom's country of Latveria to recover the goods personally.

When Iron Man attacks Doctor Doom's castle, the two are flung back in time on Doom's Time Platform by his traitorous minion Dr. Hauptmann to the days of Camelot. Iron Man meets and joins the forces of King Arthur, while Doom joins with Morgan le Fay to enlist her in helping wrest his mother's soul from Hell. Le Fay agrees on the condition that Doom become the general of her army of undead warriors slain by the sword Excalibur against her half-brother King Arthur. Accompanying Arthur's knights against Doom's army Iron Man defeats le Fay, causing her to flee to another realm. Doom swears vengeance on Iron Man for this, but the two agree to a temporary truce to use parts from both their armors to create a basic time machine to take them back to the present.

Sequels
The story arc proved quite popular and Marvel commissioned two sequels, both written by Michelinie and Layton:

"Recurring Knightmare" (Iron Man #249–250) - Iron Man and Doctor Doom are sent to the year A.D. 2089 complete with a future version of Camelot, where they must ally with a reborn Arthur - here only a young boy - and Merlin against Stark's descendant Andros Stark - now a mercenary using an old armor for his own gain - and Doom's own future self. Doom slays his double, while Iron Man wields Excalibur against his descendant, but their memories of their time in the future - including Doom's discovery of Iron Man's true identity - are erased when they are sent back to their own time, the spell that brought them to the present preventing them from bringing anything from the future back with them.
Iron Man: Legacy of Doom - A four-issue miniseries where Iron Man and Doctor Doom battle; includes a trip to Mephisto's Hell dimension.

In addition, the story arc "Time Is on No One's Side" (The Mighty Avengers #9-10) features Iron Man and Doom, along with the Sentry, being sent back in time to the 1970s-era Marvel Universe and heavily references "Doomquest", such as the two men noting that they cannot duplicate their previous success at creating a time machine from their armors as they lack the components they used originally.

What If? #33 includes the story "What If Iron Man Was Trapped in the Time of King Arthur?" In the alternate timeline, Doom does not seal the truce at the end of "Doomquest" with his word of honor. He betrays Iron Man, leaving Stark stranded with incomplete armor. "Sir Anthony of Iron" becomes a Knight of the Round Table. When Arthur is mortally wounded in battle, he names Tony as his heir. The empire he builds ushers in 1,000 years of world peace, but Tony lives the rest of his life in the Middle Ages, totally separated from the world and time in which he belongs.

Collected editions
In 2008, "Doomquest" and the sequel "Recurring Knightmare" were collected as a Marvel Premiere hardcover edition entitled Iron Man: Doomquest.

Reception
"Doomquest" was very well received and has become a fan favorite.

IGN included the story as part of its Ultimate Bookshelf 2.0: Iron Man. ComicMix included in its 10 Must-Read Stories Before You Watch 'Iron Man' in Theaters. Den of Geek called it one of the best Iron Man stories. The A.V. Club called the story "a lot of fun", giving it a B+ rating. Chris's Invincible Super-Blog said "on the short list of [Iron Man]'s necessary adventures, Doomquest sits right at the top."

References

External links
 Iron Man vs. Doctor Doom: Doomquest at Marvel.com

Comics about time travel
Comics by David Michelinie
Arthurian comics